Mainit, officially the Municipality of Mainit (Surigaonon: Lungsod nan Mainit;), is a 4th class municipality in the province of Surigao del Norte, Philippines. According to the 2020 census, it has a population of 28,019 people.

It is situated on the north shore of Lake Mainit in the north-eastern part of Mindanao. The word "mainit" literally means "hot". The other local term for "mainit" is "mapaso." Mainit is home to a hot spring, the Mapaso Wellness Resort frequented by locals and visitors from nearby towns and provinces. It is regarded that Mainit got its name from this hot sulfuric spring.

History
The first inhabitants of Mainit settled near Lake Mainit in what is now barangay San Isidro (formerly called "Daang Lungsod" or "Old Town"). It was believed that the constant harassment of pirates forced the original settlers to move to the present town site.

Mainit was established as a Barrio in 1904 under the Municipality of Placer. In 1906, it was transferred under the jurisdiction and reclassified as a Municipality of the Province of Agusan del Norte (owing to its proximity to the border of Surigao del Norte and Agusan del Norte). However, after six months, Mainit was returned to the Province of Surigao del Norte and its status was reverted to being a barangay of Placer. Mainit was finally reclassified into a separate municipality in Jan. 1, 1931 by virtue of Executive Order 290 dated December 27, 1930, signed by Governor-General Dwight F. Davis.

Two of Mainit's barangays were made into full-fledged municipalities: Tubod in 1958 and Alegria in 1968. Mainit currently has 21 Barangays.

Mainit got its name from the hot sulfuric spring which flows to the river the “Mapaso Hot Spring”. Mapaso literally is “hot”.

Geography

Barangays
Mainit is politically subdivided into 21 Barangays. In 1956, the sitios of Magpayang and Siana were elevated into full-fledged Barangays.

 Binga
 Bobona-on 
 Cantugas 
 Dayano 
 Mabini 
 Magpayang 
 Magsaysay (Poblacion) 
 Mansayao 
 Marayag 
 Matin-ao 
 Paco 
 Quezon (Poblacion) 
 Roxas 
 San Francisco 
 San Isidro 
 San Jose 
 Siana 
 Silop 
 Tagbuyawan 
 Tapi-an 
 Tolingon

Climate

Demographics

The Surigaonon language is the common local language, while Cebuano, Filipino, and English are also spoken.

Economy

Notable people
 

Petra Macliing, anti-Chico dam activist

See also
 Lake Mainit Development Alliance

References

External links

 Mainit Profile at PhilAtlas.com
 Mainit Profile at the DTI Cities and Municipalities Competitive Index
 Official Website of the Municipality of Mainit
 [ Philippine Standard Geographic Code]
 Philippine Census Information
 Local Governance Performance Management System
 Mainit Community Library Online

Municipalities of Surigao del Norte
Populated places on Lake Mainit
Spa towns in the Philippines